Giuseppe Rizza (8 April 1987 – 6 July 2020) was an Italian footballer.

Club career

Juventus
Rizza went through the Juventus youth system, and, after graduating, was sold to Juve Stabia in the former Italian Serie C1 in a co-ownership deal. In June 2008, his co-ownership was resolved, and he returned to Juventus for €50,000, but, along with several other youth players, was loaned out to Serie B teams. Rizza, along with Francesco Volpe, was sold on co-ownership deals to A.S. Livorno Calcio, who had recently been relegated to Serie B following a poor Serie A campaign. Rizza made 7 league appearances for Livorno during the 2008–09 Serie B campaign.

A.S. Livorno
Rizza was sold permanently by Juventus in June 2009, for an undisclosed fee, with Juventus profiting €86,000. Upon his permanent transfer to Livorno, Rizza was loaned out to A.C. Arezzo in July,

Death
Giuseppe Rizza died in Catania, Italy, on 6 July 2020, at the age of 33. His death was due to complications from a ruptured brain aneurysm.

References

External links
 
 

1987 births
2020 deaths
People from Noto
Italian footballers
Serie C players
S.S. Arezzo players
U.S. Livorno 1915 players
S.S. Juve Stabia players
U.S. Pergolettese 1932 players
A.S.G. Nocerina players
Association football defenders
Footballers from Sicily
Deaths from intracranial aneurysm
Neurological disease deaths in Sicily
Sportspeople from the Province of Syracuse